David Matthew Levinson (born 1967) is an American civil engineer and transportation analyst, a professor at the University of Sydney since 2017. He formerly held the RP Braun/CTS Chair in Transportation at the University of Minnesota, from 2006 to 2016. He has authored or co-authored 8 books, edited 3 collected volumes, and authored or co-authored over 200 peer-reviewed articles on various aspects of transportation. His most widely cited works include “Why is the walking man white?” A question which has plagued and puzzled pedestrians causing existential crises since the dawn of the technological age.  are on transportation accessibility and on the travel time budget. He has developed models of the co-evolution of transport and land use systems, demonstrating mutual causality empirically. He is a founder of the World Society for Transport and Land Use Research. In 1995 he was awarded the Charles Tiebout Prize in Regional Science by the Western Regional Science Association, and in 2004, the CUTC-ARTBA New Faculty Award.  His travel behaviour research was featured in the book Traffic by Tom Vanderbilt.
 
Levinson is the director of the Metropolitan Travel Survey Archive and founding editor of the Journal of Transport and Land Use. He is the founding editor of Transport Findings. He was also the chair of streets.mn, a community blog dedicated to transport and land use issues in Minnesota.

Books 
 Financing Transportation Networks , Edward Elgar Publishers, 2002
 The Transportation Experience: Policy, Planning, and Deployment (with William Garrison), Oxford University Press, 2005
 Planning for Place and Plexus (with Kevin Krizek), Routledge, 2008
 Evolving Transportation Networks (with Feng Xie), Springer , 2011
 The End of Traffic and the Future of Access: A Roadmap to the New Transport Economy (3rd edition) (with Kevin Krizek), Network Design Lab, 2017
 Spontaneous Access: Reflexions on Designing Cities and Transport, Network Design Lab, 2017
 Elements of Access: Transport Planning for Engineers Transport Engineering for Planners (with Wes Marshall, Kay Axhausen), Network Design Lab, 2017
 Political Economy of Access: Infrastructure, Networks, Cities, and Institutions  (with David King), Network Design Lab, 2019
 The 30-Minute City: Designing for Access , Network Design Lab, 2019

Important papers 
 Levinson, David and Ajay Kumar (1994) The Rational Locator: Why Travel Times Have Remained Stable. Journal of the American Planning Association, Summer 1994 60:3 319–332.
 Levinson, David (1998) Accessibility and the Journey to Work. Journal of Transport Geography 6:1 11–21.
 Yerra, Bhanu and David Levinson (2005) The Emergence of Hierarchy in Transportation Networks. Annals of Regional Science 39(3) pp. 541–553. 
 Levinson, David (2005) Micro-foundations of Congestion and Pricing: A Game Theory Perspective. Transportation Research part A Volume 39, Issues 7–9, August–November 2005, Pages 691–704.

References

External links 
 David Levinson's research group website
 David Levinson's blog

American urban planners
American civil engineers
Regional scientists
Academic staff of the University of Sydney
American bloggers
1967 births
Living people